The Roman Catholic Diocese of Bangued (Lat: Dioecesis Banguedensis) is a Roman Rite diocese of the Latin Church of the Catholic Church in the Philippines.

The current bishop is Leopoldo Corpuz Jaucian, appointed in 2007.

History
 June 12, 1955: Established as territorial prelature
 November 15, 1982: Promoted to diocese and became suffragan to the Archdiocese of Nueva Segovia.

Coat of arms
The pilgrim's staff and the two scallops are the most popular symbols of Saint James the Great, the titular of the cathedral. The blue wavy pale represents the Abra River. The mountains and green fields represent the mountainous province of Abra.

Ordinaries

See also
Catholic Church in the Philippines
List of Catholic dioceses in the Philippines

References

Bangued
Bangued
Christian organizations established in 1955
Roman Catholic dioceses and prelatures established in the 20th century
Religion in Abra (province)
1955 establishments in the Philippines